Squatting in Cambodia is the occupation of derelict buildings or unused land without the permission of the owner. Following the Khmer Rouge and the Pol Pot regime, the new democratic government introduced land reform. In the capital Phnom Penh, where in 2003 an estimated 25 per cent of the population was squatting, there are informal settlements and occupied buildings. 

Land disputes and evictions are common across Cambodia. Squatters are known officially as the "urban poor" or "temporary residents".

Legality 

Squatting is not an activity defined in Cambodian law. In the Khmer language, "squatter" means an anarchist and "squatters settlements" literally translate as "places where anarchy and confusion reign" therefore 
officially squatters are referred to by different names, such as the "urban poor" or "temporary residents".

History 

After the Khmer Rouge was ousted in 1975, many people returned to Phnom Penh and began living in their old houses or squatted informal settlements if their homes were already occupied. One example of a squatted building was the White Building. Under the Pol Pot regime (1975–1979) almost all the country's cadastral officials had been murdered. 

In 1989, the new State of Cambodia launched a sweeping land reform program, recognising 4.9 million claims for title between 1989 and 1993. The United Nations Transitional Authority in Cambodia (UNTAC) oversaw reforms and also caused land prices to soar by inserting $2.8 billion into the local economy.

Until the end of the 1990s, the Phnom Penh authorities did not recognise squatters and tended to evict squats. As of 2003, an estimated 25 per cent of the city's population were squatters. Land disputes and evictions are still common. The World Bank estimated that in Phnom Penh alone, 11,000 households had been evicted between 1998 and 2003. 

In 2005, soldiers shot dead six squatters in an eviction and the following year, soldiers and riot police were used to evict a thousand slum-dwellers in Phnom Penh. Amnesty International stated in 2008 that 150,000 people were at risk of being forcibly displaced.

As of 2014, there were estimated to be 300 slums in Phnom Penh, including the Hemakcheat, a former cinema.
There are many land disputes and the government has created the Cadastral Commission and the National Authority for Land Dispute Resolutions.

References 

Cambodia
Society of Cambodia